Borgo di Terzo is a comune in the province of Bergamo, Lombardy, in northern Italy.

Neighboring communes
Entratico
Vigano San Martino
Berzo San Fermo
Luzzana

References